The 2022 Four Nationals Figure Skating Championships were held from 16 to 18 December 2021 in Spišská Nová Ves, Slovakia. It served as the national championships for the Czech Republic, Hungary, Poland, and Slovakia. The three highest-placing skaters from each country formed their national podiums, after the competition results were split. Medals were awarded in men's singles, womens' singles, pair skating, and ice dance on the senior and junior level. The results were among the criteria used by each national federation to determine international assignments.

Medals summary

Senior

Junior

Senior results

Men

Women

Pairs

Ice dance

Junior results

Pairs

Ice dance

References 

Four National Figure Skating
International figure skating competitions hosted by Poland
Four National Figure Skating Championships
Four National Figure Skating Championships
Four National Figure Skating Championships
Four National Figure Skating Championships
Four National Figure Skating Championships
Czech Figure Skating Championships
Hungarian Figure Skating Championships
Polish Figure Skating Championships
Slovak Figure Skating Championships